Michelle Chinwendu Alozie (born 28 April 1997) is an American-born Nigerian professional footballer who plays as a forward for National Women's Soccer League team Houston Dash and the Nigeria women's national team.

Early life
Alozie was raised in Apple Valley, California.

College career
Alozie has attended the Granite Hills High School in her hometown, the Yale University in New Haven, Connecticut and the University of Tennessee.

International career
Alozie made her senior debut for Nigeria on 10 June 2021 as a 65th-minute substitution in a 0–1 friendly loss to Jamaica.

References

External links 

1997 births
Living people
Citizens of Nigeria through descent
Nigerian women's footballers
Women's association football forwards
Nigeria women's international footballers
People from Apple Valley, California
Sportspeople from San Bernardino County, California
Soccer players from California
American women's soccer players
Yale Bulldogs women's soccer players
Tennessee Volunteers women's soccer players
Houston Dash players
National Women's Soccer League players
American sportspeople of Nigerian descent
African-American women's soccer players
21st-century African-American sportspeople
21st-century African-American women